A statue of Benjamin Harvey Hill stands inside the Georgia State Capitol in Atlanta, Georgia, United States. The monumental statue was designed by American sculptor Alexander Doyle and originally dedicated in 1886 at what is now Hardy Ivy Park. The statue was relocated to the capitol building in 1890.

History

Background 
Benjamin Harvey Hill was a politician from the U.S. state of Georgia in the 1800s. During the American Civil War, he served as a member of the Confederate States Senate and was a spokesperson for Jefferson Davis, President of the Confederate States of America. Following the war, he continued his political career and served as a member of the United States Senate. Considered a prominent figure in the New South, he died on August 16, 1882. Following Hill's death, efforts were made towards the creation of a public monument in his honor. An association for this purpose, with R. D. Spalding as its president, was formed and began to fundraise for the monument. Sculptor Alexander Doyle of New York City was selected to design the monument, a statue of Hill's likeness, which he completed in 1885.

Dedication 

The statue was dedicated on May 1, 1886. Henry W. Grady served as the master of ceremonies for the event, which attracted tens of thousands of spectators. According to historian Lucian Lamar Knight, over half of the audience consisted of Confederate States Army (CSA) veterans. The location for the monument was at the southern intersection of Peachtree Street and West Peachtree Street, in the vicinity of what is today Hardy Ivy Park. General Clement A. Evans gave an invocation for the event, which was followed by an oration by Major J. C. C. Black of Augusta, Georgia and other speeches from Davis, Georgia Governor Henry Dickerson McDaniel, and Spalding. Grady, in introducing Davis to the audience, proclaimed him the "South's uncrowned king". At the introduction of Davis, the crowd responded with approximately 10 minutes of applause. Following this, Davis gave a brief speech where he said, "If I were asked from Georgia's history to name three typical men I would choose Oglethorpe the benevolent, Troup the dauntless, and Hill the faithful." The statue was formally unveiled following Spalding's speech.

A significant moment during the dedication ceremony arose when James Longstreet, who had been a lieutenant general in the CSA, was welcomed to the platform. Following the Civil War, Longstreet had been somewhat ostracized by other Confederate veterans due to his affiliation with the Republican Party. However, he had been invited to the unveiling of this statue and decided to attend. Traveling from his home in Gainesville, Georgia, he was dressed in his Confederate uniform and on horseback, initially near the outskirts of the crowd on Peachtree Street. Prior to the start of the ceremony, he was brought to the platform and given a warm embrace by Davis to the applause of the crowd.

Relocation 
In 1890, the statue was moved from its location at the intersection of Peachtree Street and West Peachtree Street to inside the Georgia State Capitol. According to a 2019 article in The Atlanta Journal-Constitution, the move was made to make room for the Erskine Memorial Fountain, which was planned for that location. The move, which had been arranged by Georgia Governor John Brown Gordon, was approved by the Georgia General Assembly in December 1890. A 2007 history book called it "the first major sculpture to enter the new statehouse". It is located in the north wing of the rotunda, near the first-floor landing. The statue is one of several pieces of art commemorating the Confederacy at the capitol, including an equestrian statue of John Brown Gordon on the building's lawn and a portrait of Robert E. Lee hanging near the chambers of the Georgia House of Representatives.

On May 30, 1893, during the funeral procession of Davis from New Orleans to his tomb in Richmond, Virginia, he was temporarily laid in state inside the Georgia State Capitol, where his open coffin was placed in front of the statue of Hill.

Design 
The monument is sculpted from Italian marble and features Hill standing atop a large pedestal. Inscribed on the four sides of the pedestal are the following:

See also 

 1886 in art
 List of Confederate monuments and memorials in Georgia
 List of public art in Atlanta

Notes

References

Bibliography

External links 

1886 establishments in Georgia (U.S. state)
1886 sculptures
Confederate States of America monuments and memorials in Georgia
Marble sculptures in Georgia (U.S. state)
Relocated buildings and structures in Georgia (U.S. state)
Sculptures of men in the United States
Statues in Atlanta